No Place Like Chrome is a collaborative album by American rappers Apathy and Celph Titled. It was released in 2006.

Track listing

References

External links

2006 albums
Apathy (rapper) albums
Celph Titled albums
Demigodz Records albums
Collaborative albums
Albums produced by J-Zone